Syed Nizamuddin, known by his professional name Satyajit or Satyajith (2 June 1949 – 10 October 2021), was an Indian actor in the Kannada film industry. Some of the notable films of Satyajit as an actor include Putnanja (1995), Shiva Mecchida Kannappa (1988), Chaitrada Premanjali (1992) and Apthamitra (2004).

Career
Satyajit has been part of more than six hundred and fifty Kannada films.

Selected filmography

   Ankush (1986) as Subhlya Hindi Film
   Aruna Raaga (1986)
   Nyayakke Shikshe (1987)
   Mr. Raja (1987)
   Anthima Theerpu (1987) 
   Thayigobba Karna (1988)
   Shiva Mecchida Kannappa (1988) 
   Ranaranga (1988)
   Nammoora Raja (1988)
   Mahadasohi Sharana Basava (1988)
   Bhoomi Thayane (1988)
 Thayigobba Karna (1988)
 Nyayakkaagi Naanu (1989)
   Yuddha Kaanda (1989) 
   Raja Yuvaraja (1989)
   Padma Vyuha (1989)
   Nyayakkaagi Naanu (1989) 
   Madhuri (1989)
   Indrajith (1989)
   Mouna Horata (1990)
   Prathap (1990)
   Nammoora Hammeera (1990) 
   Ajay Vijay (1990)
 Nammoora Hammera (1990)
   Police Lockup (1992)
   Mysore Jana (1992)
   Chaithrada Premanjali (1992)
 Gadibidi Ganda (1993)
 Mane Devru (1993)
 Sangharsha (1993)
   Chinna (1994 film)
 Mandyada Gandu (1994)
   Yama Kinkara (1995) 
   Putnanja (1995)
   Mojugara Sogasugara (1995)
   Lady Police (1995)  
   Killer Diary (1995) 
   Emergency (1995)
 Police Story (1996)
   Soma (1996)
   Simhadri (1996)
   Sathya Sangharsha (1996)
   Gulaabi (1996)
   Circle Inspector (1996)
   Boss (1996)
   Aayudha (1996)
   Aadithya (1996)
   Honey Moon (1997)
   Ellaranthalla Nanna Ganda (1997)
   Balida Mane (1997)
   Yamalokadalli Veerappan (1998)
   Simhada Guri (1998)
   One Man Army (1998)
   Kurubana Rani (1998)
   King (1998)
   Jagath Kiladi (1998)
   Arjun Abhimanyu (1998)
   Vishwa (1999)
   Patela (1999)
   Mr. X (1999)
   Garuda (1999)
   Nee Nanna Jeeva (2000)
   Minchu (2000)
   Durgada Huli (2000)
   Sathyameva Jayathe (2001)
   Appu (2002)
 Dhumm (2002)
   Abhi (2003)
   Apthamitra (2004)
  Ashoka (2006)
 Parodi (2007)
   Hudugaata (2007) 
   Arasu (2007)
 Indra
 Bhagyada Balegara (2009)
   School Master (2010)
   Oriyardori Asal (2011) 
   Hero Nanalla (2011)
   Aacharya (2011)
   Swayam Krushi (2011)
   Bhadra (2011)
   Prince (2011)
   Shravana (2011)
   Kal Manja (2011)
   Manasina Mathu (2011)
   Ee Sanje (2011)
   Kanteerava (2011)
   Prem Adda (2012)
   See U (2012)	
   Kranthiveera Sangolli Rayanna (2012)
   Snehitharu (2012)
   Ondu Kshanadalli (2012)
   Kalpana (2012)
   Jaihind (2012)
   'God Father (2012)
   Paper Doni (2012)
   Kiladi Kitty (2012)
   Narasimha (2012)
   Rana Prathap (2012)
   Lucky (2012)
   Love Junction (2013)
   Pyarge Aagbitaithe (2013) 
   Silk (2013)
   Akka Pakka (2013)
   Varadanayaka (2013) 
   Ee Ibbani (2014) 
   Namaste Madam (2014)
   Paramashiva (2014)
   Thirupathi Express (2014)
   Adhyaksha (2014)
   Hara (2014)
 Maanikya (2014)
   Shivajinagara (2014)
   Sharp Shooter (2015)
   Shambho Mahadeva (2015)
   Vamshoddharaka (2015)
   Thippajji Circle (2015)
  Uppi 2 (2015)
   Ranna (2015)
   Rana Vikrama (2015) 
   Katte (2015)
   Mythri (2015)
   Jackson (2015)
   Ranathanthra (2016) 
   Mahaveera Machideva (2016)
   Virat (2016)
   2nd Half (2018)

Tamil films
1.Aruvadai Naal (1986)

2.Irumbu Pookal (1991)

3.Uruvam (1991)

Personal life
Satyajit was married to Sophia Begum, and they have a daughter named Akthar Swaleha who is a pilot by profession in Bangalore. Their first son Akash Jith is an actor too in the Kannada film industry.

See also

List of people from Karnataka
Cinema of Karnataka
List of Indian film actors
Cinema of India

References

External links

1949 births
2021 deaths
Male actors in Kannada cinema
Indian male film actors
Male actors from Karnataka
20th-century Indian male actors
21st-century Indian male actors